During World War II, the United States Army Air Forces engaged in combat against the Empire of Japan in the South Pacific Area. As defined by the War Department, this consisted of the Pacific Ocean areas which lay south of the Equator between longitude 159° East and 110° West. It included New Zealand, New Caledonia, New Hebrides, Fiji, and most of the Solomon Islands.

In early 1942, the area was under the Seventh Air Force. By November, the Thirteenth Air Force, was formed to command and control AAF organizations in the southern areas of the widely separated Seventh Air Force and independent units scattered in the South Pacific Area during the Solomon Islands campaign. As the war progressed, Thirteenth Air Force units moved into the South West Pacific theatre and coordinated their activities with Fifth as part of the Far East Air Forces, a new formation.

Airfields and unit assignments

COOK ISLANDS

 Amuri Field, Aitutaki Island, Cook Islands
 

 Robinson (Omoka) Field, Penrhyn Island, Cook Islands
 

ELLICE ISLANDS

 Funafuti Airfield, Funafuti Atoll, Ellice Islands
 
 Seventh Air Force
 Headquarters, VII Bomber Command, November 1943 – January 1944
 11th Bombardment Group (Heavy), 2 November 1943 – 13 January 1944
 42d Bombardment Squadron (Heavy), 9 November 1943 – 8 January 1944 
 431st Bombardment Squadron (Heavy), 11 November 1943 – 15 January 1944

 Nanumea Airfield, Nanumea Atoll, Ellice Islands
 
 30th Bombardment Group, Heavy, 12 November 1943 – 3 January 1944
 27th Bombardment Squadron, Heavy, 10 November 1943 – 14 March 1944 (operated from Abemama, Gilbert Islands 26 February-14 March 1944)
 38th Bombardment Squadron, Heavy, 12 November 1943 – 12 March 1944 (operated from Makin Atoll, Gilbert Islands 26 February-22 March 1944)

 Nukufetau Airfield, Nukufetau Atoll, Ellice Islands
 
 Seventh Air FOrce
 26th Bombardment Squadron (Heavy), 11th Bombardment Group (Heavy), 11 November 1943 – 24 January 1944 (air echelon operated from Canton Island 12 November-31 December 1943)
 98th Bombardment Squadron (Heavy), 11th Bombardment Group (Heavy), 11 November 1943 – 19 January 1944

FIJI ISLANDS

 Nandi Airfield, Viti Levu Island, Fiji Islands
 
 Seventh Air Force
 42d Bombardment Group, 22 April – 6 June 1943
 394th Bombardment Squadron (Heavy), 5th Bombardment Group (Heavy), 25 December 1942 – 3 January 1943 
 Thirteenth Air Force
 394th Bombardment Squadron (Heavy), 5th Bombardment Group (Heavy), 4 January 1943 – 27 June 1943 (operated from Espiritu Santo and Guadalcanal 3–19 January 1943 and 25 April-5 June 1943)
 431st Bombardment Squadron (Heavy), 11th Bombardment Group (Heavy), 24 July-31 October 1942 (air echelon operated from New Hebrides, August 1942)

 Nausori Airfield, Viti Levu Island, Fiji Islands
 

NEW CALEDONIA

 Magenta Airfield, New Caledonia Island, New Caledonia
  
 
 Plaine Des Gaiacs Airfield, New Caledonia Island, New Caledonia
 
 Thirteenth Air Force
 Headquarters, Thirteenth Air Force, 13–21 January 1943
 Headquarters, XIII Fighter Command, 13–22 January 1943
 4th Photographic Group, 22 November 1942-May 1943
 4th Photographic Reconnaissance and Mapping Group, May–November 1943
 4th Photographic Group (Reconnaissance), November 1943-5 May 1944
 42d Bombardment Group, 20 October 1943 – 20 January 1944
 347th Fighter Group, 3 October – 29 December 1943
 42d Bombardment Squadron (Heavy), 11th Bombardment Group (Heavy), 22 July-22 November 1942

 Tontouta Airfield, New Caledonia Island, New Caledonia
 

NEW HEBRIDES ISLANDS

 Pekoa Airfield (Bomber #2), Espiritu Santo Island, New Hebrides Islands
 
 Seventh Air Force
 5th Bombardment Group (Heavy), 1 December 1942 – 3 January 1943
 23d Bombardment Squadron (Heavy), 1 December 1942 – 3 January 1943
 31st Bombardment Squadron (Heavy), 30 November 1942 – 3 January 1943
 72d Bombardment Squadron (Heavy), 24 September 1942 – 3 January 1943 (operated from Guadalcanal 4 October 1942 – 3 January 1943)
 394th Bombardment Squadron (Heavy) (operated from Espiritu Santo and Guadalcanal 3–19 January 1943 and 25 April-5 June 1943) 
 11th Bombardment Group (Heavy), 22 July 1942 – 4 January 1943
 26th Bombardment Squadron (Heavy), 22 December 1942 – 4 January 1943 
 42d Bombardment Squadron (Heavy), 23 November 1942 – 4 January 1943 (forward echelon operated from Guadalcanal)
 98th Bombardment Squadron (Heavy), 11 August 1942 – 4 January 1943 (operated from New Caledonia 21 July-11 August 1942)
 431st Bombardment Squadron (Heavy), 1 November 1942 – 4 January 1943 (forward echelon operated from Guadalcanal, December 1942)
 Thirteenth Air Force
 Headquarters, XIII Bomber Command, 13 January – 20 August 1943
 Headquarters, XIII Fighter Command, 22 January–December 1943
 5th Bombardment Group (Heavy), 4 January–18 August 1943
 23d Bombardment Squadron (Heavy), 4 January 1943 – 3 January 1944 (operated from Guadalcanal 31 March-24 August 1943 and 21 October-7 December 1943)
 31st Bombardment Squadron (Heavy), 4–17 January 1943
 72d Bombardment Squadron (Heavy), 4 January 1943 – 8 January 1944 (operated from Guadalcanal 4 January-8 August 1943, 7 October-15 November 1943 and 13 December 1943 – 27 January 1944)
 11th Bombardment Group (Heavy), 5 January-7 April 1943
 26th Bombardment Squadron (Heavy), 5 January-28 March 1943 (forward echelon operated from New Guinea January 1943)
 42d Bombardment Squadron (Heavy), 5 January-7 April 1943 
 98th Bombardment Squadron (Heavy), 5 January-7 April 1943
 431st Bombardment Squadron (Heavy), 15 January-7 April 1943 
 18th Fighter Group, 11 March – 17 April 1943
 4th Reconnaissance Group, 23 January 1943 – 6 May 1944
 403d Troop Carrier Group, 13 September 1943 – 30 August 1944

 Palikulo Bay Airfield (Bomber #1), Espiritu Santo, New Hebrides Islands
 

 Luganville Airfield (Bomber #3), Espiritu Santo Island, New Hebrides Islands
 

 Turtle Bay Airfield (Fighter #1), Espiritu Santo Island, New Hebrides Islands
 

 Efate Airfield, Efate Island, New Hebrides Islands
 
 Seventh Air Force
 26th Bombardment Squadron (Heavy), 11th Bombardment Group (Heavy), 25 July-21 December 1942 (forward echelon operated from Espiritu Santo, August 1942, and Guadalcanal, September 1942)

NEW ZEALAND

 Whenuapai Airport, Auckland, New Zealand
 

NORFOLK ISLAND

 Norfolk Airport, Norfolk Island, Australia
 

SOCIETY ISLANDS

 Bora Bora Airfield, Motu Mute Island, Society Islands
 

SOLOMON ISLANDS

Bougainville Island

 Piva Uncle (North) Field, Bougainville Island, Solomon Islands
 

 Piva Yoke (South) Field, Bougainville Island, Solomon Islands
 

Buka Island

 Buka Airfield, Buka Island, Solomon Islands
 
 419th Night Fighter Squadron (DET), 25 January – 27 May 1944

Guadalcanal Island

 Carney Airfield, Guadalcanal Island, Solomon Islands
 
 Headquarters, Thirteenth Air Force, 21 January – 15 June 1944
 Headquarters, XIII Bomber Command, 20 August 1943 – June 1944
 Headquarters, XIII Fighter Command, December 1943-15 August 1944
 18th Fighter Group, 17 April 1943 – 23 August 1944
 347th Fighter Group, 29 December 1943 – 15 January 1944
 4th Reconnaissance Group, 6 May – 12 December 1944
 419th Night Fighter Squadron, 15 November 1943 – 21 August 1944

 Henderson Field, Guadalcanal Island, Solomon Islands
 
 Thirteenth Air Force
 5th Bombardment Group (Heavy), 19 August 1943 – 4 February 1944
 31st Bombardment Squadron (Heavy), 17 January 1943 – 19 April 1944 (operated from Munda, 2 February-13 March 1944)
 72d Bombardment Squadron (Heavy) (operated from Guadalcanal 4 January-8 August 1943, 7 October-15 November 1943 and 13 December 1943 – 27 January 1944)
 394th Bombardment Squadron (Heavy), 28 June 1943 – 12 April 1944 (operated from Espiritu Santo and Guadalcanal 3–19 January 1943 and 25 April-5 June 1943 and from Munda 28 February-9 April 1944)

 Koli Airfield, Guadalcanal Island, Solomon Islands
 
 Thirteenth Air Force
 42d Bombardment Group, 6 June – 20 October 1943
 307th Bombardment Group, February 1943-28 January 1944

 Kukum Field, Guadalcanal Island, Solomon Islands
 

New Georgia Islands

 Munda Airfield, New Georgia Islands, Solomon Islands
 
 Thirteenth Air Force
 5th Bombardment Group, Heavy, 4 February–6 April 1944
 31st Bombardment Squadron (Heavy), (operated from here 2 February-13 March 1944)
 72d Bombardment Squadron (Heavy), 9 January-14 April 1944 (operated from Guadalcanal (13 December 1943 – 27 January 1944) 
 394th Bombardment Squadron (Heavy) (operated from Guadalcanal 28 February-9 April 1944) 
 307th Bombardment Group, 28 January – 29 April 1944

Russell Islands

 Renard Field, Banika Island, Russell Islands, Solomon Islands
 

 Sunlight Field, Banika Island, Russell Islands, Solomon Islands
 

TONGA ISLANDS

 Tongatubu Airfield, Tongatubu Island
 
 Seventh Air Force
 68th Fighter Squadron, 58th Fighter Group, 16 May - 28 October 1942

See also
 United States Army Air Forces in the Pacific War (1941–1945)
 USAAF in Australia
 USAAF in the Central Pacific
 USAAF in the Southwest Pacific
 USAAF in Okinawa
 South Pacific air ferry route in World War II

References

 Army Air Forces Installations Directory, 15 June 1945
 Maurer, Maurer (1983). Air Force Combat Units of World War II. Maxwell AFB, Alabama: Office of Air Force History. .
 
 U.S. Base Facilities Summary, Advance Bases, Central Pacific Area - U.S. Pacific Fleet and Pacific Ocean Areas Headquarters, 30 June 1945

Aerial operations and battles of World War II involving the United States
United States Army Air Forces
Airfields of the United States Army Air Forces in the Pacific Ocean theatre of World War II